Ichthyophis glandulosus, the  Basilan Island caecilian,  is a species of amphibian in the family Ichthyophiidae endemic to the Philippines. Its natural habitats are subtropical or tropical moist lowland forests, subtropical or tropical moist montane forests, rivers, intermittent rivers, freshwater springs, plantations, rural gardens, heavily degraded former forest, irrigated land and seasonally flooded agricultural land. The population is unknown as only two specimens have been collected.

References

glandulosus
Amphibians described in 1923
Amphibians of the Philippines
Endemic fauna of the Philippines
Fauna of Basilan
Taxonomy articles created by Polbot